Mutsu (陸奥) was the second and last  dreadnought battleship built for the Imperial Japanese Navy (IJN) at the end of World War I. It was named after the province.  In 1923 she carried supplies for the survivors of the Great Kantō earthquake. The ship was modernized in 1934–1936 with improvements to her armour and machinery, and a rebuilt superstructure in the pagoda mast style.

Other than participating in the Battle of Midway and the Battle of the Eastern Solomons in 1942, where she did not see any significant combat, Mutsu spent most of the first year of the Pacific War in training. She returned to Japan in early 1943. That June, one of her aft magazines detonated while she was at anchor, sinking the ship with the loss of 1,121 crew and visitors. The IJN investigation into the cause of her loss concluded that it was the work of a disgruntled crew member. The navy dispersed the survivors in an attempt to conceal the sinking in the interest of morale in Japan. Much of the wreck was scrapped after the war, but some artefacts and relics are on display in Japan, and a small portion of the ship remains where it was sunk.

Description
Her crew consisted of 1,333 officers and enlisted men as built and 1,368 in 1935. The crew totaled around 1,475 men in 1942.

In 1927, Mutsus bow was remodeled to reduce the amount of spray produced when steaming into a head sea. She was given torpedo bulges to improve her underwater protection and to compensate for the weight of the additional armour and equipment.

Propulsion
Mutsu was equipped with four Gihon geared steam turbines, each of which drove one propeller shaft.

During a refit in 1924 the fore funnel was rebuilt in a serpentine shape in an unsuccessful effort to prevent smoke interference with the bridge and fire-control systems. In addition her turbines were replaced by lighter, more modern, units.

Armament
Mutsus eight 45-caliber  guns were mounted in two pairs of twin-gun, superfiring turrets fore and aft. Numbered one to four from front to rear, the hydraulically powered turrets gave the guns an elevation range of −2 to +35 degrees. The rate of fire for the guns was around two rounds per minute. A special Type 3 Sankaidan incendiary shrapnel shell was developed in the 1930s for anti-aircraft use. The turrets aboard the Nagato-class ships were replaced in the mid-1930s using those stored from the unfinished s.

The ship's secondary armament of twenty 50-calibre  guns was mounted in casemates on the upper sides of the hull and in the superstructure. Anti-aircraft defence was provided by four 40-calibre 8-centimetre (3 in) 3rd Year Type AA guns in single mounts. These guns had a maximum elevation of +75 degrees, and a rate of fire of 13 to 20 rounds per minute. The ship was also fitted with eight  torpedo tubes, four on each broadside, two above water and two submerged.

Around 1926, the four above-water torpedo tubes were removed and the ship received three additional 76 mm AA guns that were situated around the base of the foremast. The 76 mm AA guns were replaced by eight 40-calibre  dual-purpose guns in 1932, fitted on both sides of the fore and aft superstructures in four twin-gun mounts. Their maximum rate of fire was 14 rounds a minute, but their sustained rate of fire was around eight rounds per minute. Two twin-gun mounts for licence-built Vickers 2-pounder "pom-pom" light AA guns were also added to the ship in 1932. They had a maximum rate of fire of 200 rounds per minute.

The two-pounders were replaced by 1941 by 20 licence-built Hotchkiss 25 mm (1 in) Type 96 light AA guns in five twin-gun mounts. This was the standard Japanese light AA gun during World War II, but it suffered from severe design shortcomings that rendered it a largely ineffective weapon. According to historian Mark Stille, the twin and triple mounts "lacked sufficient speed in train or elevation; the gun sights were unable to handle fast targets; the gun exhibited excessive vibration; the magazine was too small, and, finally, the gun produced excessive muzzle blast". The maximum effective rate of fire was only between 110 and 120 rounds per minute because of the frequent need to change the 15-round magazines.

Armour
The barbettes of the turrets were protected by armour 305 mm thick, and the casemates of the 140 mm guns were protected by 25 mm armour plates.

The new 41 cm turrets installed during Mutsus reconstruction were more heavily armoured than the original ones. The armour over the machinery and magazines was increased by 38 mm on the upper deck and 25 mm on the upper armoured deck. In early 1941, in preparation for war, Mutsus barbette armour was reinforced with  armour plates above the main deck and  plates below it.

Aircraft
Mutsu had an additional boom added to the mainmast in 1926 to handle the Yokosuka E1Y floatplane recently assigned to the ship. In 1933 a catapult was fitted between the mainmast and Turret No. 3, and a collapsible crane was installed in a port-side sponson the following year; the ship was equipped to operate two or three seaplanes, although no hangar was provided. The ship was operating Nakajima E4N2 biplanes until they were replaced by Nakajima E8N2 biplanes in 1938. A more powerful catapult was installed in November 1938 to handle heavier aircraft like the single Kawanishi E7K, added in 1939–40. Mitsubishi F1M biplanes replaced the E8Ns on 11 February 1943.

Fire control and sensors
The ship was fitted with a  rangefinder in the forward superstructure. Additional  and  anti-aircraft rangefinders were also fitted, although the date is unknown. The rangefinders in No. 2 and 3 turrets were replaced by 10-metre units in 1932–33.

Mutsu was initially fitted with a Type 13 fire-control system derived from Vickers equipment received during World War I, but this was replaced by an improved Type 14 system around 1925. It controlled the main and secondary guns; no provision was made for anti-aircraft fire until the Type 31 fire-control director was introduced in 1932. A modified Type 14 fire-control system was tested aboard her sister ship  in 1935 and later approved for service as the Type 94. A new anti-aircraft director, also called the Type 94, used to control the 127 mm AA guns, was introduced in 1937, although when Mutsu received hers is unknown. The 25 mm AA guns were controlled by a Type 95 director that was also introduced in 1937.

Construction and service

Mutsu, named for Mutsu Province, was laid down at the Yokosuka Naval Arsenal on 1 June 1918 and launched on 31 May 1920. Funding for the ship had partly come from donations from schoolchildren. While Mutsu was still fitting out, the American government called a conference in Washington, D.C. late in 1921 to forestall the expensive naval arms race that was developing between the United States, the United Kingdom and the Empire of Japan. The Washington Naval Conference convened on 12 November and the Americans proposed to scrap virtually every capital ship under construction or being fitted out by the participating nations. Mutsu was specifically listed among those to be scrapped even though she had been commissioned a few weeks earlier. This was unacceptable to the Japanese delegates; they agreed to a compromise that allowed them to keep Mutsu in exchange for scrapping the obsolete dreadnought , with a similar arrangement for several American  dreadnoughts that were fitting out. Mutsu was commissioned on 24 October 1921 with Captain Shizen Komaki in command. Captain Seiichi Kurose assumed command on 18 November and the ship was assigned to the 1st Battleship Division on 1 December. Mutsu hosted Edward, Prince of Wales, and his aide-de-camp and second cousin, Lieutenant Louis Mountbatten, on 12 April 1922 during the prince's visit to Japan.

On 4 September 1923, Mutsu loaded supplies at Uchinoura Bay, Kyushu, for the victims of the Great Kantō earthquake. With her sister Nagato, she sank the hulk of the obsolete battleship  on 7 September 1924 during gunnery practice in Tokyo Bay, in accordance with the Washington Naval Treaty. Captain Mitsumasa Yonai, later Prime Minister of Japan, assumed command on 10 November. The ship was transferred to the reserve on 1 December 1925. Mutsu served as flagship of Emperor Hirohito during the 1927 naval manoeuvres and fleet review. Captain Zengo Yoshida relieved Captain Teikichi Hori on 10 December 1928. On 29 March 1929, the ship was assigned to Battleship Division 3, together with three light cruisers.

Mutsus anti-aircraft armament was upgraded during 1932. Upon completion, she was assigned to Battleship Division 1 of the 1st Fleet, and again served as the Emperor's flagship during the annual maneuvers and fleet review in 1933. The ship was placed in reserve on 15 November and began her lengthy reconstruction. This was completed on 30 September 1936 and Mutsu rejoined the 1st Battleship Division on 1 December 1936. In August 1937, she transported 2,000 men of the 11th Infantry Division to Shanghai during the Second Sino-Japanese War. Her seaplanes bombed targets in Shanghai on 24 August before she returned to Sasebo the following day. On 15 November 1938, Captain Aritomo Gotō assumed command of the ship. Mutsu was placed in reserve from 15 December 1938 to 15 November 1939. She was refitted in early 1941 in preparation for war; as part of this work, she was fitted with external degaussing coils and additional armour for her barbettes.

World War II

During the war Mutsu saw limited action, spending much of her time in home waters. On 18 January 1942, Mutsu towed the obsolete armoured cruiser  as a target for the new battleship , which promptly sank Nisshin.

In June 1942 Mutsu, commanded by Rear Admiral Gunji Kogure, was assigned to the Main Body of the 1st Fleet during the Battle of Midway, together with Yamato, Nagato, Hōshō, the light cruiser Sendai, nine destroyers, and four auxiliary ships. Following the loss of all four carriers on 4 June, Yamamoto attempted to lure the American forces west to within range of the Japanese air groups at Wake Island, and into a night engagement with his surface forces, but the American forces withdrew and Mutsu saw no action. After rendezvousing with the remnants of the striking force on 6 June, about half of the survivors from the sunken aircraft carriers of the 1st Air Fleet were transferred to Mutsu. She arrived at Hashirajima on 14 June.

On 14 July, Mutsu was transferred to Battleship Division 2 and then to the advance force of the 2nd Fleet on 9 August. They arrived at Truk on 17 August. On 20 August, while sailing from Truk to rendezvous with the main body of the 3rd Fleet, Mutsu, the heavy cruiser Atago, and escorting destroyers unsuccessfully attempted to locate the escort carrier  in response to a flying boat detecting the American ship.

During the Battle of the Eastern Solomons on 27 August, Mutsu, assigned to the support force, fired four shells at enemy reconnaissance aircraft, the first and only time her guns were fired in anger during the war. Mutsu returned to Truk on 2 September; a group of skilled AA gunnery officers and men were detached to serve as instructors to ground-based naval anti-aircraft gunners stationed in Rabaul. During October Mutsu off-loaded surplus fuel oil to the fleet oil tanker Kenyo Maru, allowing the tanker to refuel other ships involved in Guadalcanal operations. On 7 January 1943, Mutsu departed from Truk for Japan via Saipan, accompanied by the carrier , the heavy cruiser  and four destroyers. Mutsu left Hashirajima for Kure on 13 April, where she prepared to sortie to reinforce the Japanese garrisons in the Aleutian Islands in response to the Battle of the Komandorski Islands. The operation was cancelled the next day and the ship resumed training.

Loss
On 8 June 1943, Mutsu was moored in the Hashirajima fleet anchorage, with 113 flying cadets and 40 instructors from the Tsuchiura Naval Air Group aboard for familiarisation. At 12:13 the magazine of her No. 3 turret exploded, destroying the adjacent structure of the ship and cutting her in two. A massive influx of water into the machinery spaces caused the  forward section of the ship to capsize to starboard and sink almost immediately. The  stern section upended and remained floating until about 02:00 hours on 9 June before sinking, coming to rest a few hundred feet south of the main wreck at coordinates .

Only 13 of the visiting aviators were among the survivors.

After the explosion, as the rescue operations commenced, the fleet was alerted and the area was searched for Allied submarines, but no traces were found. To avert the potential damage to morale from the loss of a battleship so soon after the string of recent setbacks in the war effort, Mutsus destruction was declared a state secret. Mass cremations of recovered bodies began almost immediately after the sinking. Captain Teruhiko Miyoshi's body was recovered by divers on 17 June, but his wife was not officially notified until 6 January 1944. Both he and his second in command, Captain Koro Oono, were posthumously promoted to rear admiral, as was normal practice. To further prevent rumours from spreading, healthy and recovered survivors were reassigned to various garrisons in the Pacific Ocean. Some of the survivors were sent to Truk in the Caroline Islands and assigned to the 41st Guard Force. Another 150 were sent to Saipan in the Mariana Islands, where most were killed in 1944 during the battle for the island.

At the time of the explosion, Mutsus magazine contained some 16-inch Type 3 "Sanshikidan" incendiary shrapnel anti-aircraft shells, which had caused a fire at the Sagami arsenal several years earlier due to improper storage. Because they might have been the cause of the explosion, the minister of the navy, Admiral Shimada Shigetaro, immediately ordered the removal of Type 3 shells from all IJN ships carrying them, until the conclusion of the investigation into the loss.

Investigation into the loss
A commission led by Admiral Kōichi Shiozawa was convened three days after the sinking to investigate the loss. The commission considered several possible causes:
 Sabotage by enemy secret agents. Given the heavy security at the anchorage and lack of claims of responsibility by the Allies, this could be discounted.
 Sabotage by a disgruntled crewman. While no individual was named in the commission's final report, its conclusion was that the cause of the explosion was most likely a crewman in No. 3 turret who had recently been accused of theft and was believed to be suicidal.
 A midget or fleet submarine attack. Extensive searches immediately following the sinking had failed to detect any enemy submarine, and the Allies had made no attempt at claiming the enormous propaganda value of sinking a capital ship in her home anchorage; consequently, this possibility was quickly discounted. Eyewitnesses also spoke of a reddish-brown fireball, which indicated a magazine explosion; this was confirmed during exploration of the wreck by divers.
 Accidental explosion within a magazine. While the Mutsu carried many projectiles, immediate suspicion focused on the Type 3 anti-aircraft shell as it was believed to have caused a fire before the war at the Sagami arsenal. Known as  "sanshiki-dan" (Japanese for "type 3 shell"), these were fired by the main armament and contained 900 to 1,200 25 mm diameter steel tubes (depending upon sources), each containing an incendiary charge. Tests were conducted at Kamegakubi Naval Proving Ground on several shells salvaged from No. 3 turret and on shells from the previous and succeeding manufacturing batches. Using a specially built model of the Mutsus No. 3 turret, the experiments were unable to induce the shells to explode under normal conditions.

The commission issued its preliminary conclusions on 25 June, well before the divers had completed their investigation of the wreck, and concluded that the explosion was the result of a disgruntled seaman. Historian Mike Williams put forward an alternative theory of fire:

A number of observers noted smoke coming from the vicinity of No. 3 turret and the aircraft area just forward of it, just before the explosion. Compared with other nations' warships in wartime service, Japanese battleships contained a large amount of flammable materials including wooden decking, furniture, and insulation, as well as cotton and wool bedding. Although she had been modernized in the 1930s, some of the Mutsus original electrical wiring may have remained in use. While fire in the secure magazines was a very remote possibility, a fire in an area adjacent to the No. 3 magazine could have raised the temperature to a level sufficient to ignite the highly sensitive black-powder primers stored in the magazine and thus cause the explosion.

Salvage operations

Divers were brought into the area to retrieve bodies and to assess the damage to the ship. Prior to diving on the wreck they were allowed to familiarize themselves on board Mutsus sister ship, Nagato. The Navy leadership initially gave serious consideration to raising the wreck and rebuilding her, although these plans were dropped after the divers completed their survey of the ship on 22 July. Thus Mutsu was struck from the Navy List on 1 September. As part of the investigation, Dive-boat No. 3746, a small Nishimura-class search and rescue submarine, explored the wreck on 17 June with a crew of seven officers. While crawling on the harbour bottom, it became snagged on the wreckage and its crew nearly suffocated before they could free themselves and surface. In July 1944, the oil-starved IJN recovered  of fuel from the wreck.

The  diameter chrysanthemum mon, symbol of the Imperial Throne, was raised in 1953 but lost or scrapped shortly thereafter. One of the 140 mm casemate guns was raised in 1963 and donated to the Yasukuni Shrine. In 1970, the Fukada Salvage Company began salvage operations that lasted until 1978 and scrapped about 75% of the ship. The two aft turrets were raised in 1970 and 1971. Despite the fact that the salvaged components were remarkably preserved, in particular the two gun turrets, bow (including chrysanthemum mount) and stern (with every propeller, and intact rudders and steering gear), the ship was broken up for its low-background steel and sold to an anonymous "research institute." The salvagers retrieved 849 bodies of crewmen lost during the explosion. In 1995, the Mutsu Memorial Museum declared that no further salvage operations were planned.

Surviving artifacts

In addition to the 140 mm gun donated to the Yasukuni Shrine, now on display at the Yasukuni Museum, the following items recovered over the years can be viewed at various museums and memorials in Japan:
 Many artifacts are displayed at the Mutsu Memorial Museum in Tōwa-chō. This is a successor to a local museum funded by the town of Suō-Ōshima which opened in July 1970. To make room for a new road, this museum was moved in April 1994 to a new building. Since 1963, a memorial service has been held here every year on 8 June in honour of the crew. A very large portion of the bow was located at Suo-Oshima until at least 2012, but it may have been moved or lost.
 The fully restored No. 4 turret is on display on the grounds of the former Imperial Japanese Naval Academy at Etajima. This is the ship's original turret, removed during her refit in the 1930s.
 One 410 mm gun from No. 3 turret formerly on display at the Museum of Maritime Science, Shinagawa, in Tokyo was relocated to the grounds of the Verny Commemorative Museum in Yokosuka in September 2016.
 A rudder and a section of propeller shaft were on display at the Arashiyama Art Museum until it closed around 1991. The rudder, an anchor and one propeller have been relocated to the JMSDF Kure Museum, directly across the street from the Yamato Museum. The left-side 410 mm gun from No. 3 turret is displayed outside as well, in Daiwa Park, Kure. The current whereabouts of the propeller shaft is now unknown.
 A part of the number three gun turret's armour is on display at Shide Shrine in Yokkaichi, Mie Prefecture.
 One of the 410 mm guns is on display at the Hijiri Museum in Omi, Nagano.

Notes

Footnotes

References

External links

 Maritimequest.com: Mutsu photo gallery
 Combinedfleet.com: service history – key dates 

Nagato-class battleships
Second Sino-Japanese War naval ships of Japan
World War II battleships of Japan
1920 ships
Ships built by Yokosuka Naval Arsenal
Maritime incidents in June 1943
Naval magazine explosions
Ships sunk by non-combat internal explosions
World War II shipwrecks in the Pacific Ocean
Shipwrecks in the Inland Sea
Cover-ups